Guildlings is a 2019 adventure video game for iOS by Sirvo. It was a featured release on Apple Arcade.

References

External links 

 

2019 video games
Indie video games
Adventure games
IOS games
Video games developed in the United States
Games financed by Indie Fund
Single-player video games
Apple Arcade games